Walter Hensen Miller (21 October 1917 – 26 May 1992) was an Australian rules footballer who played with the Fitzroy Football Club in the Victorian Football League (VFL).

Notes

External links 

Wally Miller's playing statistics from The VFA Project

1917 births
Australian rules footballers from Melbourne
Fitzroy Football Club players
Preston Football Club (VFA) players
1992 deaths
People from Footscray, Victoria